The 2018–19 Biathlon World Cup – Pursuit Women started on Sunday 9 December 2018 in Pokljuka and finished on Saturday 23 March 2019 in Holmenkollen. It was won by Dorothea Wierer of Italy, with the defending titlist, Anastasiya Kuzmina of Slovakia, finishing third.

Competition format
The  pursuit race is skied over five laps. The biathlete shoots four times at any shooting lane, in the order of prone, prone, standing, standing, totalling 20 targets. For each missed target a biathlete has to run a  penalty loop. Competitors' starts are staggered, according to the result of the previous sprint race.

2017–18 Top 3 standings

Medal winners

Standings

References

Pursuit Women